Hints for Swimmers was among the earliest regularly scheduled television series. Broadcast in 1931 on New York City station W2XAB (now WCBS-TV), it was a series featuring Charles Speer which aired in a 15-minute time-slot. It was among the first TV series to have aired on a CBS station.

Scheduling
The episode telecast August 21, 1931 aired at 10:15PM, preceded by Connie Boswell (songs) and followed by Ruth Perrott (songs) (see section "television").

The episode telecast August 28, 1931 aired at 10:15PM, preceded by singer Julia Mahoney, and followed by Flora Triest (songs) and violinist Sandro Rosati (see section "television").

The episode telecast September 4, 1931  aired at 10:15PM, preceded by Alexis Sandersen (songs) and followed by Natalie Towers (see section "television").

The episode telecast September 11, 1931 aired at 10:15PM, preceded by singer Julia Mahoney and followed by singer Harriet Lee (see section "television")

The episode telecast September 18, 1931 aired at 10:15PM, preceded by singer Helen Nugent and followed by singer Harriet Lee (see section "television").

The episode telecast October 2, 1931 aired at 10:15PM, preceded by singer Helen Nugent and followed by singer Harriet Lee (see section "television").

At least two other episodes also aired (they appear in TV listings, but the top of the newspaper with the date is cut-off)

References

External links

1930s American television series
1931 American television series debuts
1931 American television series endings
American live television series
Lost television shows
Black-and-white American television shows